Jonathan Taylor (1796April 1848) was an American lawyer and politician who served one term as a U.S. Representative from Ohio from 1839 to 1841.

Biography 
Born near Mansfield, Connecticut, Taylor moved to Newark, Ohio.
He completed an academic course.
He studied law.
He was admitted to the bar and commenced practice in Newark.
He was appointed by the Governor a commissioner to settle the boundary dispute between Ohio and Michigan.
Brigadier general in the State militia.
He served as member of the State house of representatives 1831–1833.
He served in the State senate 1833–1836.

Taylor was elected as a Democrat to the Twenty-sixth Congress (March 4, 1839 – March 3, 1841).
He died in Newark, Ohio, in April 1848.
He was interred in the Old Cemetery.
He was reinterred in Cedar Hill Cemetery.

Sources

1796 births
1848 deaths
Politicians from Newark, Ohio
Democratic Party Ohio state senators
Democratic Party members of the Ohio House of Representatives
Ohio lawyers
People from Ohio in the War of 1812
American surveyors
American militia generals
Burials at Cedar Hill Cemetery, Newark, Ohio
People from Mansfield, Connecticut
19th-century American politicians
19th-century American lawyers
Democratic Party members of the United States House of Representatives from Ohio